The National Airlines Open Invitational was a professional golf tournament in south Florida on the PGA Tour. It was held in late March in Hialeah at the West Course of the Country Club of Miami in 1969, 1970, and 1971  At the time, it was among the richest events on tour, with a $200,000 purse and a $40,000 winner's share.

Gary Player was the final champion in 1971, two strokes ahead of defending champion Lee Trevino, who won the previous year in a playoff over Bob Menne. Player's win was his 75th worldwide.

In 1972, it was replaced on the schedule by the Jackie Gleason Inverrary Classic in Lauderhill, initially a month earlier in late February. Miami-based National Airlines co-sponsored its second edition in 1973, also won by Trevino, but not after. That tournament ended its affiliation with Gleason after 1980 and continues today as The Honda Classic in Palm Beach Gardens.

The other PGA Tour event in the Miami area was the Doral Open, which began in 1962 and was usually played in early March. It was sponsored by competing carrier Eastern Air Lines, also Miami-based, from 1970 through 1986.

Winners

References

External links
Country Club of Miami

Former PGA Tour events
Golf in Florida
Sports competitions in Miami
Recurring sporting events established in 1969
Recurring sporting events disestablished in 1971
1969 establishments in Florida
1971 disestablishments in Florida